Shell Lake is an unincorporated community in St. Francis County, Arkansas, United States.

References

Unincorporated communities in St. Francis County, Arkansas
Unincorporated communities in Arkansas